Mathieu Cordang (6 December 1869 – 24 March 1942) was a Dutch professional cyclist. His specialties were track racing and endurance racing.

Biography 
Cordang started racing in 1893, after he left a boat in Vlissingen where a cycling race was being held. He borrowed a bicycle, won the race, and decided to take up cycle-racing.

In 1894, he set a world record for the mile on a tandem, and finished second in the Dutch national road race championships behind Jaap Eden. One year later, he raced a train between Maastricht and Roermond and won. Cordang won the amateur 100 km motor-paced world championship in 1895 in Köln.

Cordang was a professional from 1896 to 1900. In 1897 he finished second in Paris–Roubaix after falling in the velodrome in Roubaix. The winner, Maurice Garin, did not wait for him and won by 30meters. He also rode Bordeaux-Paris in 1897, sponsored by Gladiator, which built a team around him, and provided 25 bicycles. He finished second behind Gaston Rivierre who had extra help in the form of a car.
In the same year, Cordang broke five world records on the track of The Crystal Palace in London.

During the Bol d'Or in 1900, Cordang set a 24-hour record of 999.651 km. After that, he won the 3 km race in the 1900 Summer Olympics in Paris. This included professionals, so it is not considered official by the International Olympic Committee.

Cordang ended his career after this. According to his grandson, he stopped because he was cheated too often. Cordang became the owner of a garage company. He died in 1942, largely unnoticed. When a namesake died in 1962, the Dutch press printed obituaries for Cordang.

Palmares 
Source:

1894
Amsterdam-Arnhem-Amsterdam
Maastricht-Nijmegen-Maastricht
Rotterdam-Utrecht-Rotterdam
World record 1000 km
1895
Amsterdam-Arnhem-Amsterdam
Leiden-Utrecht-Leiden
Maastricht-Roermond against train
World champion pace racing
1896
5th place  Bordeaux-Paris
1897
24 hours of Crystal Palace (991,651 km)
2nd Bordeaux-Paris
2nd Paris–Roubaix
3rd 1000 km Défi Routier 
1898
100 km GP Roubaix
100 km GP Amsterdam
200 km GP Berlijn
1899
100 km GP Den Haag
World record 24 hours (1000,110 km)
1900
Olympic Games:
Bol d'Or (unofficial event)
3 km (unofficial event)

References

External links 
"Vergeten sportheld" Mathieu Cordang, Sportgeschiedenis.nl
Cordang, Joannes Matheus (1869-1942) in Biografisch Woordenboek van Nederland 4, 1994, Huygens Instituut voor Nederlandse Geschiedenis.

1869 births
1942 deaths
Dutch male cyclists
Sportspeople from Venlo
Sportspeople from Limburg (Netherlands)
UCI Track Cycling World Champions (men)
Dutch track cyclists
19th-century Dutch people
20th-century Dutch people